The Mississippi Department of Agriculture and Commerce abbreviates to MDAC. For all other references see MDAC.

The Mississippi Department of Agriculture and Commerce (also sometimes referred to as the MDAC) is a government department of Mississippi, headquartered in Jackson. MDAC regulates agricultural-related businesses within Mississippi, as well as promotes Mississippi products throughout the world. To fulfill these goals, the department was created by the Mississippi Legislature in 1906.

The Commissioner of MDAC is an elected office.  The position is contested every four years at the same time as the gubernatorial election. The commissioner regulates agriculture and aquaculture in the state and promotes their products.

Commissioners of Agriculture and Commerce, 1906–present

References

Works cited

Further reading

External links

 Mississippi Department Agriculture and Commerce official website

State agencies of Mississippi
State departments of agriculture of the United States
 
1906 establishments in Mississippi